Falsomordellistena hebraica is a species of tumbling flower beetle in the family Mordellidae. It is found in North America from Mexico to Canada.

References

Further reading

 

Mordellidae
Beetles of North America
Beetles described in 1862
Taxa named by John Lawrence LeConte
Articles created by Qbugbot